Tartrate-resistant acid phosphatase (TRAP or TRAPase), also called acid phosphatase 5, tartrate resistant (ACP5), is a glycosylated monomeric metalloprotein enzyme expressed in mammals. It has a molecular weight of approximately 35kDa, a basic isoelectric point (7.6–9.5), and optimal activity in acidic conditions. TRAP is synthesized as latent proenzyme and activated by proteolytic cleavage and reduction. It is differentiated from other mammalian acid phosphatases by its resistance to inhibition by tartrate and by its molecular weight.

The mechanism of phosphate ester hydrolysis by TRAP is through a nucleophilic attack mechanism, whereby, catalysis occurs with the binding of a phosphate-substrate to the Fe2+ in the active site of TRAP. This is then followed by a nucleophilic attack by a hydroxide ligand on the bound phosphorus atom, resulting in cleavage of the phosphate ester bond and production of an alcohol. The exact identity and mechanism of the hydroxide ligand is unclear, but it is thought to be either a hydroxide that bridges the metal ions within the active site or a terminal hydroxide bound to Fe3+, with conflicting reports for both mechanisms.

TRAP expression and cell localization

Under normal circumstances, TRAP is highly expressed by osteoclasts, activated macrophages, neurons,  and by the porcine endometrium during pregnancy. In newborn rats, TRAP is also detectable in the spleen, thymus, liver, kidneys, skin, lung, and heart at low levels. TRAP expression is increased in certain pathological conditions. These include leukaemic reticuloendotheliosis (hairy cell leukaemia), Gaucher’s disease, HIV-induced encephalopathy, osteoclastoma and osteoporosis, and metabolic bone diseases.

In osteoclasts, TRAP is localized within the ruffled border area, the lysosomes, the Golgi cisternae and vesicles.

TRAP gene, promoter organisation and transcription

Mammalian TRAP is encoded by one gene, which is localized on chromosome 19 (19p13.2–13.3) in humans, and on chromosome 9 in mice. TRAP DNA is, as expected from protein sequencing, highly conserved throughout the class mammalia. The TRAP gene has been cloned and sequenced in porcine, rat, human, and murine species.
Human, murine, and porcine TRAP genes all contain 5 exons, and have the ATG codon at the beginning of exon 2, with exon 1 being non-coding. Within the exon 1 promoter, there are three distinct “tissue-specific” promoters: 1A, 1B, and 1C. This would allow TRAP expression to be tightly controlled.
Transcribed from this gene is a 1.5kb mRNA with an open reading frame (ORF) of 969-975 bp encoding a 323-325 amino acid protein. In the rat, the ORF is 981 bp in length and encodes for a 327-amino acid protein. TRAP is translated as a single polypeptide.
TRAP gene transcription is regulated by the Microphthalmia-associated transcription factor.

Physiology and pathology

Many functions have been attributed to TRAP, and its physiologic role(s) are likely to be manifold. The mice knockout studies as well as the human disorder associated with genetic deficiency of TRAP shed some light onto its functions.
In knockout studies, TRAP−/− mice exhibit mild osteopetrosis, associated with reduced osteoclast activity. These result in thickening and shortening of the cortices, formation of club-like deformities in the distal femur, and widened epiphyseal growth plates with delayed mineralization of cartilage, all of which increase with age. In TRAP overexpressing transgenic mice, mild osteoporosis occurs along with increased osteoblast activity and bone synthesis.
Proposed functions of TRAP include osteopontin /bone sialoprotein dephosphorylation, the generation of reactive oxygen species (ROS), iron transport, and as a cell growth and differentiation factor.
Genetic deficiency of TRAP, determined by biallelic recessive mutations in the ACP5 gene, are the basis of the human disorder spondylenchondrodysplasia. The clinical phenotype involves the bone, the central nervous system, and the immune system. The pathogenesis probably includes a defect in bone reabsorption as well as immune dysregulation because of impaired dephosphorylation of osteopontin, but may be more complex and needs to be elucidated further.

Protein dephosphorylation and osteoclast migration

It has been shown that osteopontin and bone sialoprotein, bone matrix phosphoproteins, are highly efficient in vitro TRAP substrates, which bind to osteoclasts when phosphorylated. Upon partial dephosphorylation, both osteopontin and bone sialoprotein are incapable of binding to osteoclasts. From this effect, it has been hypothesized that TRAP is secreted from the ruffled border, dephosphorylates osteopontin and allows osteoclast migration, and further resorption to occur.

ROS generation

Reactive oxygen species (ROS) are generated in macrophages and osteoclasts from superoxide (O2−.), which forms from the action of NADPH-oxidase on oxygen (O2). They play an essential role in the function of phagocytic cells.

TRAP, containing a redox active iron, catalyzes the generation of ROS through Fenton chemistry:

 O2 → (NADPH-oxidase) O2− ∙ → (superoxide dismutase) H2O2 → (catalase) H2O + O2
 TRAP-Fe3+ (purple) + O2− ∙→ TRAP-Fe2+ (pink) + O2
 H2O2 + TRAP-Fe2+ (pink) → HO∙ + HO− + TRAP-Fe3+

producing hydroxyl radicals, hydrogen peroxide, and singlet oxygen.
In osteoclasts, ROS are generated at the ruffled border and seem to be required for resorption and degradation to occur.

Iron transport

In the pregnant sow, uteroferrin is highly expressed in the uterine fluids. Due to the unique anatomy of the porcine uterus, and the specific, progesterone-induced expression of TRAP; it is hypothesized that uteroferrin acts as an iron transport protein.

Cell growth and differentiation factor

TRAP is associated with osteoclast migration to bone resorption sites, and, once there, TRAP is believed to initiate osteoclast differentiation, activation, and proliferation. This hypothesis was formed from the examination of the bone structure of TRAP-null mice. It was noted that, in addition to osteopetrosis, bone formation occurred in a haphazard manner, where the microarchitecture was highly irregular.

In TRAP overexpressing mice, it has been found that the affected mice are grossly obese. This has led to the hypothesis that TRAP has involvement in hyperplastic obesity.

References

External links 
 

   

EC 3.1.3.2